Lassen Hotel is a historic hotel building located at 7808 West 138th Place in Cedar Lake, Lake County, Indiana.  It is a  two-story, "T"-shaped frame building sheathed in clapboard. It has a hipped roof and features a wraparound verandah overlooking Cedar Lake. The building was built about 1895 and Jon Vasil painted it and moved to its present location and enlarged in 1920. It is home to the Red Cedars Lake History Museum. A restoration project was underway in 2013.

It was listed in the National Register of Historic Places in 1981.

References

History museums in Indiana
Hotel buildings on the National Register of Historic Places in Indiana
Hotel buildings completed in 1895
Buildings and structures in Lake County, Indiana
National Register of Historic Places in Lake County, Indiana